Lake Sapsho is a glacial lake in Demidovsky District of Smolensk Oblast, Russia. It is the largest lake (3,04 km2) of the Smolenskoye Poozerye National Park. It is situated northeast of Demidov in the northwestern part of the oblast, near the settlement of Przhevalskoye.
A famous 19th century Russian traveller Nikolay Przhevalsky compared the lake with Lake Baikal in miniature. The lake is a natural monument. It is connected with the Baltic Sea by the Sapsha, Vasilyevka, Yelsha, and Daugava rivers. There are 4 big and 2 small islands on the lake. There are a lot of tumuli of the Tushumlin culture by Lake Sapsho.
The flora and fauna of the lake are very diverse. Yet in the beginning of the 20th century there was the industrial fishery. Though now any industry is prohibited here. A lot of species of the flora and fauna of the lake are in the Red Book.

Geography and hydrography

The Lake

Lake Sapsho is situated in the north-west of Smolensk Oblast,  to the north of Smolensk. It is on the Sloboda Upland that is a part of Smolensk–Moscow Upland. It is the largest lake in Smolenskoye Poozerye National Park. There are two eskers. One of them is partly destroyed by glacial flows. It caused the arising of five of six islands. Lake Sapsho is divided into deep northern and shallow southern parts. The other esker forms the western border of the lake. The northern side is also abrupt. On the contrary, the eastern and southern sides are gentle. The bottom of the lake here is also not steep. The northern basin is divided into western and eastern parts by a long underwater spit.

Lake Sapsho drains into the rivers of the Western Dvina basin. In spring, usually by the middle or end of April, water volume increases because of melting snow. The melting of ice on the lake usually takes from 10 to 15 days more, and ends in the late April or early May. The swimming season opens in late June or early July, and finishes in late July or early August. The lake usually covers with ice in the 2nd or 3rd decade of November. Sometimes, it happens in the middle of December. The period of freeze-up is from 150 to 170 days.

The Rivers 
Inflow rivers are the Sapshanka in the south and the Sapsha in the west. The outflow river is the Sapsha in the east. The Sapsha connects Lake Sapsho and Lake Petrakovskoye. Both lakes have similar surface elevation. During the period of melting snow in spring and heavy showers in summer Lake Petrakovskoye fills with water faster than Lake Sapsho. Therefore, the Sapsha changes its flow. Usually changing of flow of the Sapsha happens several times a year.

The Islands 
There 6 islands on the lake. Four of them are large: Chernetsky / Monk Island, Raspashnoy / Border Island, Bagryany / Crimson Island, Dlinny / Long Island. Two of them are small: Dubovy / Oak Island and Lyubvi / Island of Love. Five of them are located in line along one of two eskers.

References

Sapsho
Sapsho
Tourist attractions in Smolensk Oblast